Xi'an North railway station is a railway station on the Zhengxi Passenger Railway, Xibao Passenger Railway and Daxi Passenger Railway. The station is located in Weiyang District of Xi'an, the capital of Shaanxi province.

The station has 34 platforms. It is the largest railway station in Northwest China.

History

Construction began on September 19, 2008. The station was opened on January 11, 2011. It has since been expanded.

Service

Rail
Xi'an North station is served by the fast (G-series and D-series) trains running on the Zhengzhou–Xi'an High-Speed Railway, Xi'an–Baoji High-Speed Railway, Yinchuan–Xi'an high-speed railway and Datong–Xi'an Passenger Railway, Xi'an–Chengdu high-speed railway. All other passenger trains serving Xi'an run from Xi'an railway station, just north of downtown.

Metro
The station is connected to Line 2 of Xi'an Metro at Beikezhan station, and connected to Line 4 and Line 14 of Xi'an Metro at Beikezhan (Beiguangchang) station.

References

Railway stations in Xi'an
Railway stations in China opened in 2011
Stations on the Xuzhou–Lanzhou High-Speed Railway